Calamari Productions is an Emmy Award-winning independent film and digital content distribution company based in Los Angeles.

The company has the unique distinction of being the only media production company in the United States with state Supreme Court access to film inside America's child welfare and juvenile courts, juvenile detention centers, and juvenile prisons.  Calamari's access has resulted in numerous award winning documentary films and network television series for outlets including MTV, Dateline NBC, A&E, Court TV, ABC News, MSNBC, PBS and more. The company's unprecedented foray into the U.S. juvenile justice system is unique because these venues are—by law—closed to the media and public.

In 2020, the company launched a first-ever streaming education platform, Society Education Media, an online platform offering educators, students, advocates and professionals unprecedented video access to the closed world of America's juvenile justice and social work arenas.

Awards
Edward R. Murrow Award- Best Writing
National  Edward R. Murrow Award- Best Documentary
National Emmy Nominee- Best Documentary
Emmy Award- Best Documentary
Emmy Award- Best Writing
National Headliner Award- News Documentary
Columbus International Film Festival- Award Winner
Headliner Award
Casey Medal For Meritorious Journalism- Television: Long Form
National IRE Award- Television: Network/Syndicated
American Society On The Abuse Of Children- Outstanding Media Coverage
Anna Quindlen Child Welfare League of America Award- Excellence in reporting on behalf of children and families
Council of Juvenile and Family Court Judges Award- Exceptional Contribution to the Juvenile Courts
IARRCA "Friend of the Child" Award- Efforts on Behalf of Children
Associated Press Broadcasters Award- First Place
Best Coverage of Children's Issues- Society of Professional Journalists

References

Sources
The National Council of Juvenile and Family Court Judges Magazine/Summer 2002
The New York Times (April 12, 2002)
Chicago Public Radio (March 8, 2007)
The Northwest Indiana Times (February 2, 2007)
The Gary Post Tribune (January 28, 2007)

External links
Calamari Productions
 https://www.societyeducationmedia.com

Television production companies of the United States